Ekaterina Matlashova  (born 25 September 1994) is a Russian handball player for SCM Craiova and the Russian national team.

She was selected to represent Russia at the 2017 World Women's Handball Championship.

References

1994 births
Living people
Russian female handball players
Sportspeople from Astrakhan